Batarhat is a village in Kamrup Rural District, in the state of Assam, India. It is situated on the south bank of river Brahmaputra.

Transport
The village is near National Highway 31 and connected to nearby towns and cities like Chaygaon, Bijoynagar and Guwahati with regular buses and other modes of transportation.

See also
 Baruajani
 Barpalaha

References

Villages in Kamrup district